Anagymnites is an extinct genus of cephalopods belonging to the Ammonite subclass.

References 

The Paleobiology Database - Anagymnites entry Accessed 7 December 2011

Gymnitidae
Ceratitida genera
Anisian life